Stephen (1084–95) was the knez ("duke") of Bosnia mentioned in the Chronicle of the Priest of Duklja ("Bosnam posuitque ibi Stephanum knezium", according to Johannes Lucius), appointed in  1083–84 by his first cousin Constantine Bodin, the King of Duklja. He was the first Bosnian ruler known by name. Bodin had also appointed his relative Vukan at Rascia. Bosnia, Zachlumia and Rascia were never incorporated into an integrated state with Duklja; each principality had its own nobility and institutions, simply requiring a member of the Dukljan royal family to rule as prince or duke. According to Jacob Luccari's Annals of Ragusa (1605), Stephen participated in the siege of Ragusa in 1094–95, as Bodin's vassal.

After Constantine died, the principalities seceded from Duklja, and Vukan became the most powerful Serb ruler, as grand prince. As Kočapar felt danger from that side as well, he took refuge in Bosnia, where he married the daughter of the "Bosnian ban" in ca. 1100–01, though he died soon afterwards while fighting in Zachlumia. This Bosnian ban was most likely Stephen. Luccari and Orbini mention Stephen's son and successor Vukmir (Vutïmir). The territory governed by Stephen cannot be precisely known, apart from the fact that the name of Bosnia was identified with the region of the upper and middle basin of the Bosna river, with the area of the Sarajevo and Visoko fields.

References

Sources

 
 

Dukes of Bosnia
Principality of Bosnia (early medieval)
Bosnian monarchs
11th-century rulers in Europe
12th-century Bosnian people